Eucalyptus olida is a species of small to medium-sized tree that is endemic to a restricted area of New South Wales, Australia. It has rough, flaky and fibrous bark on the trunk and larger branches, lance-shaped to curved adult leaves, flower buds in groups of seven to fifteen or more, white flowers and barrel-shaped or bell-shaped fruit.

Description
Flowering has been recorded in February and the flowers are white. The fruit is a woody, barrel-shaped or bell-shaped capsule with the valves near rim level.

Taxonomy and naming
Eucalyptus olida was first formally described in 1990 by Lawrie Johnson and Ken Hill in the journal Telopea. The specific epithet (olida) is from the Latin olidus, meaning "smelling" or "rank", referring to the odour of the leaves when crushed.

Distribution and habitat
This eucalypt is restricted to the Timbarra Plateau and Gibraltar Range National Park where it grows in forest and woodland in shallow soil derived from granite.

Uses

Essential oils
The leaves of E. olida are distilled for their crystalline essential oils used in flavouring and perfumery. The leaf oil is 98% methyl cinnamate and yield is 2-6% of fresh leaf weight.

Use in food
The leaf of E. olida is also used as a dried spice product in bushfood cooking, especially with fruit and in herbal teas. It has high anti-oxidant activity.

Gallery

References

Bushfood
Flora of New South Wales
olida
Myrtales of Australia
Trees of Australia
Taxa named by Lawrence Alexander Sidney Johnson
Taxa named by Ken Hill (botanist)